David Lee Foy (born 20 October 1972) is an English former professional footballer who played as a midfielder in the Football League for Birmingham City and Scunthorpe United. After playing in the Football League he had a long career in non-league football.

Football career
Foy was born in Coventry. He joined Birmingham City as a trainee in 1979, and turned professional two years later. He made his first-team debut as a substitute in the League Cup in November 1991, and the following year spent time on loan at League of Ireland club Cobh Ramblers. Foy made his Football League debut in the First Division (second tier) on 13 February 1993 in a 3–2 home defeat to Portsmouth. He started the next two games, but soon afterwards was allowed to leave for Scunthorpe United on a free transfer. In his debut game he made a late goalline clearance which earned his club a 0–0 draw against Wrexham, but Scunthorpe released him at the end of the season and he joined Stafford Rangers.

After something over a season in the Conference with Stafford, Foy joined Tamworth, where he spent seven years. In his final season the club narrowly failed to win the Southern League league title, and Foy, not selected for the last few games of the campaign, was frustrated by his inability to contribute. In May 2002 he left Tamworth for Worcester City. Foy damaged a cruciate ligament only ten games into his Worcester career, and his two years at the club was disrupted by injury. He spent the last few months of the 2003–04 season on loan to Halesowen Town before being released by Worcester. He joined Conference North club Moor Green, but by December 2004 was being loaned out to Stratford Town of the Midland Alliance, and moved on to Southern League Division One West club Bedworth United at the end of the season. However, Foy's domestic circumstances meant that in March 2006 he chose to make a permanent move to Stratford Town to reduce the amount of travelling required. After rejoining Stratford Town in 2008, Foy made a total of 51 appearances (39 in the league) across all three spells, scoring twice (both in the league).

References

External links

1972 births
Living people
Footballers from Coventry
English footballers
Association football midfielders
Birmingham City F.C. players
Cobh Ramblers F.C. players
Scunthorpe United F.C. players
Stafford Rangers F.C. players
Tamworth F.C. players
Worcester City F.C. players
Halesowen Town F.C. players
Moor Green F.C. players
Stratford Town F.C. players
Bedworth United F.C. players
English Football League players
Southern Football League players
National League (English football) players